Camp Lacupolis is an unincorporated community in Pepin Township, Wabasha County, Minnesota, United States, along the Mississippi River and Lake Pepin.

The community is located between Lake City and Wabasha along U.S. Highway 61 near 223rd Avenue.

Nearby places include Lake City, Wabasha, Maple Springs, and Reads Landing.

It is a historic fishing community along the Mississippi River and Lake Pepin known for its resorts.  The name Camp Lacupolis means "Camp Lake City" in Greek.

References

Unincorporated communities in Minnesota
Unincorporated communities in Wabasha County, Minnesota
Rochester metropolitan area, Minnesota
Minnesota populated places on the Mississippi River